Tomáš Hučko (born 3 October 1985) is a Slovak footballer who plays for Slovan Galanta in 3. Liga - West as a defender.

Club career
Hučko spent most of his career playing in Slovakia, firstly with Dukla Banská Bystrica, who he joined in 2006 and remained for the next seven years. He signed for Žilina in 2013, before moving to Baník Ostrava in the Czech Republic in August 2016.

References

External links
Baník Ostrava profile 

Futbalnet profile 

1985 births
Living people
Sportspeople from Šaľa
Slovak footballers
Slovak expatriate footballers
Association football midfielders
FK Slovan Duslo Šaľa players
FK Dukla Banská Bystrica players
MŠK Žilina players
ŠKF Sereď players
FC Baník Ostrava players
FC Slovan Galanta players
Slovak Super Liga players
2. Liga (Slovakia) players
3. Liga (Slovakia) players
Czech National Football League players
Expatriate footballers in the Czech Republic
Slovak expatriate sportspeople in the Czech Republic